The 2011 Houston Dynamo season was the sixth season of the team's existence, breaking the record for the most seasons played for a Houston soccer team. The Dynamo had been tied with Houston Hurricanes, who competed in the USISL D3 Pro League from 1996 to 2000.  It was the Dynamo's sixth season with head coach Dominic Kinnear and majority owner Philip Anschultz. It was Chris Canettis first season as team president, having worked as chief operating officer for the previous five.

Prior to the season, Houston was switched to MLS's Eastern Conference along with Sporting Kansas City due to expansion teams Portland Timbers and Vancouver Whitecaps joining the Western Conference.  It was the Dynamo's final season playing at Robertson Stadium, with the new BBVA Compass Stadium set to open the following year.

After failing to qualify for the playoffs in 2010, Houston rebounded and finished 2nd in the conference.  During the 2011 MLS Cup Playoffs, Houston beat the Philadelphia Union 3–1 over two legs.  In the Eastern Conference Final, Houston defeated Kansas City 2–0 to reach their third ever MLS Cup, where they fell 1–0 to the Los Angeles Galaxy in the final. The Dynamo failed to qualify for the U.S. Open Cup, losing to Sporting Kansas City in the Qualification Semi-finals.

Final roster
As of November 21, 2011.

Appearances and goals are totals for MLS regular season only.

Player movement

In 
Per Major League Soccer and club policies terms of the deals do not get disclosed.

Out 
Per Major League Soccer and club policies terms of the deals do not get disclosed.

Loans in

Loans out

MLS SuperDraft

MLS Supplemental Draft

Coaching staff
As of November 21, 2011.

Friendlies

Competitions

Major League Soccer

Standings

Eastern Conference

Overall

Results summary

Match results

MLS Cup Playoffs

U.S. Open Cup

Player statistics

Appearances, goals, and assists 
{| class="wikitable sortable" style="text-align:center;"
|+
! rowspan="2" |
! rowspan="2" |
! rowspan="2" |
! rowspan="2" |
! colspan="3" |
! colspan="3" |
! colspan="3" |
! colspan="3" |
|-
!!!!!!!!!!!!!!!!!!!!!!!
|-
|1||GK||||align=left|||38||0||0||34||0||0||4||0||0||0||0||0
|-
|2||DF||||align=left|||3||0||0||2||0||0||0||0||0||1||0||0
|-
|3||FW||||align=left|||13||2||0||9||1||0||4||1||0||0||0||0
|-
|4||DF||||align=left|||15||0||1||13||0||1||2||0||0||0||0||0
|-
|5||MF||||align=left|||25||2||3||20||2||3||4||0||0||1||0||0
|-
|7||FW||||align=left|||31||4||3||29||4||3||1||0||0||0||0||0
|-
|8||DF||||align=left|||8||0||0||7||0||0||0||0||0||1||0||0
|-
|9||FW||||align=left|||11||0||0||10||0||0||0||0||0||1||0||0
|-
|10||MF||||align=left|||25||1||2||22||1||2||3||0||0||0||0||0
|-
|11||MF||||align=left|||37||4||18||34||4||16||3||0||2||0||0||0
|-
|12||FW||||align=left|||29||5||1||25||5||1||3||0||0||1||0||0
|-
|13||MF||||align=left|||0||0||0||0||0||0||0||0||0||0||0||0
|-
|14||DF||||align=left|||1||0||0||0||0||0||0||0||0||1||0||0
|-
|15||FW||||align=left|||29||4||1||28||4||1||0||0||0||1||0||0
|-
|16||MF||||align=left|||17||2||1||13||2||1||4||0||0||0||0||0
|-
|17||MF||||align=left|||11||0||3||7||0||2||4||0||1||0||0||0
|-
|17||DF||||align=left|||8||0||0||7||0||0||0||0||0||1||0||0
|-
|18||MF||||align=left|||0||0||0||0||0||0||0||0||0||0||0||0
|-
|19||MF||||align=left|||8||1||0||7||1||0||0||0||0||1||0||0
|-
|20||DF||||align=left|||37||5||5||33||5||5||4||0||0||0||0||0
|-
|21||DF||||align=left|||23||1||2||23||1||2||0||0||0||0||0||0
|-
|22||MF||||align=left|||20||1||0||19||1||0||0||0||0||1||0||0
|-
|23||FW||||align=left|||1||0||0||1||0||0||0||0||0||0||0||0
|-
|24||GK||||align=left|||1||0||0||0||0||0||0||0||0||1||0||0
|-
|25||FW||||align=left|||24||6||2||20||5||1||4||1||1||0||0||0
|-
|26||DF||||align=left|||37||0||0||32||0||0||4||0||0||1||0||0
|-
|27||FW||||align=left|||15||2||1||11||1||1||4||1||0||0||0||0
|-
|27||FW||||align=left|||7||1||0||7||1||0||0||0||0||0||0||0
|-
|28||GK||||align=left|||0||0||0||0||0||0||0||0||0||0||0||0
|-
|31||DF||||align=left|||35||2||1||31||0||1||4||2||0||0||0||0
|-
|32||DF||||align=left|||33||5||1||28||5||1||4||0||0||1||0||0
|-

Disciplinary record 
{| class="wikitable sortable" style="text-align:center;"
|+
!width=15 rowspan="2" |
!width=15 rowspan="2" |
!width=15 rowspan="2" |
!width=100 rowspan="2" |Player
! colspan="2" |Total
! colspan="2" |MLS
! colspan="2" |Playoffs
! colspan="2" |U.S. Open Cup
|-
!style="width:30px;"|!!style="width:30px;"|!!style="width:30px;"|!!style="width:30px;"|!!style="width:30px;"|!!style="width:30px;"|!!style="width:30px;"|!!style="width:30px;"|
|-
|1||GK||||align=left|||1||0||1||0||0||0||0||0
|-
|3||FW||||align=left|||1||0||0||0||1||0||0||0
|-
|4||DF||||align=left|||2||0||2||0||0||0||0||0
|-
|5||MF||||align=left|||6||0||5||0||1||0||0||0
|-
|7||FW||||align=left|||1||1||1||1||0||0||0||0
|-
|8||DF||||align=left|||3||1||2||1||0||0||1||0
|-
|10||MF||||align=left|||4||1||4||1||0||0||0||0
|-
|11||MF||||align=left|||5||0||5||0||0||0||0||0
|-
|12||WF||||align=left|||1||0||1||0||0||0||0||0
|-
|15||FW||||align=left|||3||0||3||0||0||0||0||0
|-
|16||MF||||align=left|||4||1||3||1||1||0||0||0
|-
|17||MF||||align=left|||2||0||0||0||2||0||0||0
|-
|17||DF||||align=left|||2||0||1||0||0||0||1||0
|-
|20||DF||||align=left|||2||0||2||0||0||0||0||0
|-
|21||DF||||align=left|||3||0||3||0||0||0||0||0
|-
|22||MF||||align=left|||5||1||4||1||0||0||1||0
|-
|25||FW||||align=left|||0||1||0||1||0||0||0||0
|-
|26||DF||||align=left|||2||0||2||0||0||0||0||0
|-
|27||FW||||align=left|||2||1||1||1||1||0||0||0
|-
|31||DF||||align=left|||2||0||1||0||1||0||0||0
|-
|32||DF||||align=left|||8||0||6||0||1||0||1||0
|-

Honors and awards

MLS Player of the Month

MLS Player of the Week

MLS Goal of the Week

Annual

Dynamo team awards

Kits 
Supplier: Adidas / Sponsor: Greenstar

References

Houston Dynamo FC seasons
Houston Dynamo
Houston Dynamo
Houston Dynamo season